Night Vale Presents, formerly known as Commonplace Books, is a production company and independent podcast network founded in 2015 by Joseph Fink and Jeffrey Cranor. In 2016 Night Vale Presents expanded into a network hosting original podcasts other than Welcome to Night Vale. Night Vale Presents is partnered with Public Radio Exchange.

The network started off with only fiction podcasts, but later expanded to include nonfiction and commentary podcasts as well. Notable podcasts in the network include Welcome to Night Vale, Alice Isn't Dead, and Sleep with Me.

Overview

Notes

Current shows

Conversations with People Who Hate Me 
Night Vale Presents' first non-fiction podcast, Conversations With People Who Hate Me, premiered on July 30, 2017. It is a weekly discussion-based podcast featuring Dylan Marron talking with people who have sent him hateful comments online, or mediating conversations between others who have had arguments online including celebrity guests.

Good Morning Night Vale 
Good Morning Night Vale is an aftershow for Welcome to Night Vale featuring Night Vale voice actors Meg Bashwiner, Symphony Sanders, and Hal Lublin breaking down and discussing every episode of the show.

Harry Potter and the Sacred Text 

Night Vale Presents announced in January 2019 that they had added the podcast Harry Potter and the Sacred Text, previously presented by Panoply, to the network's roster. Hosted by Vanessa Zoltan and Casper Ter Kuile since its inception in May 2016, the podcast attempts to read the Harry Potter books as a sacred text, exploring the characters and context of one chapter per episode through a different central theme.

I Only Listen to The Mountain Goats 
I Only Listen To The Mountain Goats, features conversations between Joseph Fink and musician John Darnielle of the band The Mountain Goats. Each episode features a new cover of a Mountain Goats song by a different artist. The first season, focusing on the band's album All Hail West Texas, aired from September 27, 2017, to April 5, 2018. An album featuring all the covers from the first season was released the day after the finale digitally and on vinyl. Season two, focusing on the band's then-upcoming album In League with Dragons premiered on April 4, 2019.

It Makes A Sound 
It Makes A Sound aired from September 2017 to January 2018 and detailed an amateur radio host's love of a local musician named Wim Faros and her hopes of revitalizing her hometown. The podcast was created, written, and narrated by Jacquelyn Landgraf. A soundtrack album based on the first season was released called Win Faros: The Attic Tapes was released on January 30, 2019.

Our Plague Year 
On March 13, 2020, a new weekly podcast created by Joseph Fink called Our Plague Year was launched with the intent to help assuage anxieties during the COVID-19 pandemic.

Random Number Generator Horror Podcast No. 9 
Random Number Generator Horror Podcast No. 9 is a horror podcast hosted by Jeffrey Cranor and Cecil Baldwin. The duo spend each episode talking about a specific horror film chosen via random dice roll. It premiered on August 10, 2020.

Sleep with Me 

On March 28, 2018, Night Vale Presents added Sleep with Me to their network. The show was previously presented by "Dearest Scooter" from 2013 to 2017, and by Feral Audio from 2017 to 2018. It is a storytelling and health-based podcast hosted by creator Drew Ackerman, designed to help listeners fall asleep.

Start with This 
Start With This, a non-fiction podcast by Night Vale co-creators Joseph Fink and Jeffrey Cranor, premiered on March 22, 2019. It features the duo sharing writing tips and prompts for listeners to sharpen their own writing skills. There is a forum Patreon supporters for the series in which people can share and receive feedback on their writing.

The Orbiting Human Circus 

A third NVP network podcast, The Orbiting Human Circus (of the Air), was released in collaboration with WNYC Studios, and the first Night Vale Presents podcast to be produced by somebody other than Joseph Fink or Jeffrey Cranor. This radio drama podcast is written by and stars musician Julian Koster, It depicts Koster as a shy janitor named Julian working in the Eiffel Tower, where his favorite show entitled The Orbiting Human Circus is performed. His frequent attempts to appear on the show often end in embarrassment and depression for Julian. Drew Callander voices the narrator inside Julian's head, and John Cameron Mitchell voices John Cameron, the host of The Orbiting Human Circus. The first season ran from  October 2016 to May 2018. The second season ran from November 6, 2019, to March 18, 2020.

Within the Wires 

The second NVP network podcast is Within the Wires is an anthology series of found audio tapes, written by Night Vale cowriter Jeffrey Cranor, as well as and Janina Matthewson. Season one is narrated by Matthewson and told as a series of relaxation tapes prepared for a patient in a mysterious medical center known as "The Institute." As the story unfolds, it became clear that the narrator of the tapes had a connection to the patient, and may have had a secret agenda. The first season of 10 episodes was released between June and November 2016. The second season, narrated by Rima Te Wiata, is presented as a series of museum audio guides and aired from September 2017, to January 2018. The third season, narrated by Lee LeBreton, is a political thriller set in 1950s Chicago told through letters from a bureaucrat to his secretary. It aired from September 2018, to January 2019. The fourth season ran from September to December 2019 and is about a mother, voiced by Mona Greene, who records audio notes to her daughter while leading an anti-government commune called The Cradle with music by Mary Epworth.

Welcome to Night Vale 

Welcome to Night Vale is a twice monthly podcast in the form of community radio broadcasts for a fictional desert town, the eponymous Night Vale, where strange and supernatural occurrences are normal. Cecil Gershwin Palmer, the host and narrator, is voiced by Cecil Baldwin. The series was created in 2012 by Joseph Fink and Jeffrey Cranor, first published by Commonplace Books. The podcast has been published by Night Vale Presents since its inception March 15, 2015. The series is also being adapted for television.

Completed shows

Adventures in New America 
Adventures in New America is a fiction podcast created by Stephen Winter and Tristan Cowen which premiered on September 28, 2018. It is described as "the first sci-fi, political satire, Afrofuturistic buddy comedy" podcast. It followed two African-New-American friends, the lonely curmudgeon IA, and lesbian thief Simon Carr as they partake in a series of high-stakes heists to get quick cash to pay for IA's medical treatment. It stars an ensemble cast featuring Paige Gilbert, Bryan Webster, Pernell Walker, Starlee Kine, and Stephen Winter.

Alice Isn't Dead

The first NVP network podcast, Alice Isn't Dead, is written by Night Vale cowriter Joseph Fink, and was performed by Jasika Nicole, who played Dana on Night Vale. The story is presented as monologues broadcast over a trucker CB radio, as a woman named Keisha drives a truck across America, looking for her missing wife. The first season of 10 episodes was released between March and July 2016, and a second season began airing in April 2017 to August 2017. The third and final season aired from April 2018 to August 2018. A novel based on the series was released on October 30, 2018. The series is also being adapted for television.

Dreamboy 
Dreamboy is a fiction podcast created by and starring musician Dane Terry. The first season aired from October 2018, to March 2019. The musical mystery podcast is about a "spun-out musician" and zoo employee named Dane living in Cleveland, Ohio as he attempts to solve the mystery of mysterious flickering lights across town, as well as a murderous zebra. On December 3, 2019, it was announced that there would not be another season of the podcast.

Pounded in the Butt by My Own Podcast 
Pounded In The Butt By My Own Podcast premiered on March 13, 2018, and features various celebrity guests performing short stories by erotic comedy writer Chuck Tingle. It concluded on December 24, 2018

References

Podcasting companies
Night Vale Presents